Ward One: Along the Way is the debut studio album by former Black Sabbath and English heavy metal drummer Bill Ward. Originally released January 10, 1990, it features a wide array of guest musicians, including then-former Black Sabbath band member Ozzy Osbourne.

Cover art issue

As originally released, Ward One featured a cover art image with a white background and a "one man band" motif.  Bill Ward has stated in interviews and on his website that this artwork was not intended to be the proper artwork, and was replaced for a reprint with a much more somber "black" cover.  Shortly after the black cover was issued, the record label (Chameleon) went out of business, and as such, the black cover art, while being Bill's preferred, is much harder to come by than the white one.  The cover image for the white version does remain in the black version, albeit as interior artwork.

Track listing
"(Mobile) Shooting Gallery" (Ward, Phillips, Lynch) – 5:11
"Short Stories" (Ward, M. Bruce) – 1:06
"Bombers (Can Open Bomb Bays)" (Ward, Phillips, Lynch) – 4:23
"Pink Clouds an Island" (Ward) – 3:15
"Light Up the Candles (Let There Be Peace Tonight)" (Ward, Phillips, J. Bruce) – 3:35
"Snakes & Ladders" (Ward, Phillips) – 6:35
"Jack's Land" (Ward, Yeager) – 4:41
"Living Naked" (Ward, Lynch) – 6:03
"Music For a Raw Nerve Ending" (Ward) – 2:05
"Tall Stories" (Ward, Lynch) – 5:04
"Sweep" (Ward) – 4:00
"Along the Way" (Ward, Phillips, Lynch) – 3:09

Musicians
 Bill Ward ; Drums, keyboards, vocals
 Zakk Wylde, Lanny Cordola, Rue Phillips, Keith Lynch, Malcolm Bruce, Richard Ward : Guitar 
 Jack Bruce, Bob Daisley, Marco Mendoza, Gordon Copley, Lee Faulkner : Bass guitar
 Mike Rodgers, Malcolm Bruce, Jimmy Yaeger : Keyboards
 Ozzy Osbourne, Jack Bruce, Lorraine Perry, Rue Phillips : Vocals 
 Eric Singer, Leonice : Drums

References

External links
Ward One at Black Sabbath Online
Bombers (Can Open Bomb Bays) music video on YouTube

1990 debut albums
Bill Ward (musician) albums